Rodovia Euclides da Cunha (official denomination SP-320) is a state highway in the state of São Paulo.  The highway is named after Brazilian writer Euclides da Cunha.

The highway begins in Mirassol, on the SP-310, and ends in the city of Rubinéia, at the Paraná river, where it connects with the state of Mato Grosso do Sul by a road-rail bridge.

Cities served by the highway

Fernandópolis
Jales
Mirassol
Santa Fé do Sul
Tanabi
Votuporanga

Junctions

 SP-310
 SP-377
 SP-479
 SP-461
 SP-527
 SP-543
 SP-463
 SP-561
 SP-595

See also

Highway system of São Paulo
List of state highways in São Paulo

Highways in São Paulo (state)